Elisabeth Palm (27 July 1756 – 27 June 1786) was a Swedish etcher and printmaker of German and Dutch descent.

Biography
Palm was born in Constantinople, a daughter of Consul General of Sweden to the Ottoman Empire, Cornelius Asmund Palm and Eva van Bruyn. She was married to businessman Johan Schön.
Palm studied art with Jacob Gillberg in 1770. She is represented at the National Museum of Sweden with two etchings.

Palm died at Seglingsbergs bruk in June 1786 of tuberculosis.

Works
Etching

References 

1786 deaths
1756 births
People from Constantinople
Artists from Istanbul
Swedish etchers
Swedish printmakers
Swedish people of German descent
Swedish people of Dutch descent
18th-century Swedish artists
18th-century deaths from tuberculosis
Tuberculosis deaths in Sweden